The 2015 MAC Championship Game was an NCAA Division I college football conference championship game for the Mid-American Conference. The game was played at Ford Field in Detroit on Friday, December 4, 2015, and featured Bowling Green (East Division winners) defeat Northern Illinois (West Division) 34–14.

History

Teams

Bowling Green Falcons
Bowling Green dominated the MAC East, with their only conference loss coming to West division co-champion Toledo. Bowling Green's resume also featured non-conference wins over Big Ten Conference teams Maryland and Purdue and a narrow three-point loss to a Memphis team that finished 9–3 in the regular season.

Northern Illinois Huskies

Scoring summary
1st quarter scoring:

2nd quarter scoring:

3rd quarter scoring:

4th quarter scoring:

References

Championship Game
MAC Championship Game
Bowling Green Falcons football games
Northern Illinois Huskies football games
American football competitions in Detroit
MAC Championship Game
MAC Championship Game
MAC Championship Game